Social interface is a concept from social science (particularly, media ecology (Marshall McLuhan) and sociology of technology).

It can be approached from a theoretical or a practical perspective.

As a concept of social interface theory, social interface is defined by Norman Long (1989, 2001). In 2001 his revised definition was:

In other words, interfaces are the areas in which social friction can be experienced and where diffusion of new technology is leading to structural discontinuities (which can be both positive or negative), the interface is where they will occur. Long continues to say that:

Identifying these interfaces and analyzing their effects shows how they are changed by everyday life, and how in return everyday life is changed by the interfaces.

As practical concept of social interface design, social interface is seen in the studies of human-computer interaction (in particular, its computer interface aspect). The basic thesis is that where a computer interface is more akin to another human, it can facilitate correct responses from users during human-to-computer interaction. Software that can provide such humanizing cues often does it by creating interface with human-like quality (such as giving recognizable gender to a software agent). Studies are often concerned with how should such agents (like the Microsoft Agent) be designed to make them more appealing (is having facial expressions efficient, should the agent be anthropomorphic, and so on).

See also
 Interactivity

Notes

External links
 Michael Feldstein: "A Different Take on Social Interfaces"
 social interface theory

Sociological theories
User interfaces